Akelarre is a modern Basque restaurant founded in 1974 by Pedro Subijana, and located in Igeldo quarter of San Sebastián, Gipuzkoa, Spain. The restaurant is known for its local seafood. It has achieved three Michelin stars.

About 
Since 2017, it has its own 5-star hotel with 22 rooms with views of the Cantabrian Sea, and the Oteiza Restaurant, named after the famous sculptor that frequented the Akelarre Restaurant. Its wine cellar has more than 650 wines of reference from Spain and all around the world.

See also
 List of Basque restaurants

References

Michelin Guide starred restaurants in Spain
Basque restaurants
San Sebastián
Buildings and structures in Gipuzkoa
Restaurants established in 1974
1974 establishments in Spain